Hasanabad (also Romanized as Ḩasanābād; also known as Ḩasanābād-e Chāhreh Sīyāh) is a village in Bakhtajerd Rural District, in the Central District of Darab County, Fars Province, Iran. At the 2006 census, its population was 30, in 8 families.

References 

Populated places in Darab County